The Cuban Revolutionary Air and Air Defense Force commonly abbreviated to DAAFAR in both Spanish and English, is the air force of Cuba.

History

Background 
The Cuban Army Air Force was the air force of Cuba that existed prior to 1959.

Early years under Castro 

When the Cuban Revolution overthrew the government of Fulgencio Batista at the end of 1958, the new government led by Fidel Castro inherited most of the aircraft and equipment of the old regime, which was supplemented by the aircraft of the revolutionaries own Fueza Aérea Rebelde, to form the new Fuerza Aérea Revolucionaria (FAR). Arrests of many of the personnel (including 40 pilots) of the old air force meant that the FAR was short of manpower to operate its aircraft, while lack of spare parts further reduced operational efficiency and a US-inspired arms embargo restricted efforts to acquire replacement aircraft.

In April 1961, CIA-backed Cuban exiles attempted an invasion of Cuba with the aim of overthrowing Castro's government. The invasion was preceded on 17 April by air attacks on Cuban airfields in an attempt to destroy the FAR prior to the invasion, with several FAR aircraft being destroyed. The remaining operational aircraft were deployed against the Cuban exiles landings on 19 April, sinking one transport, the Rio Escondido and badly damaging another, the Houston, which was beached, resulting in the loss of most of the invader's supplies.

In 1969, the inadequacy of the radar coverage to the south of the United States were dramatically illustrated when a Cuban Air Force MiG-17 went undetected before it landed at Homestead Air Force Base, Florida and two years later, an Antonov An-24 similarly arrived unannounced at New Orleans International Airport.

Later years 
In the 1980s, Cuba with the help of the Soviet Union was able to project power abroad, using its air force, especially in Africa. During that time Cuba sent jet fighters and transports for deployment in conflict zones such as Angola and Ethiopia.

In 1990, Cuba's Air Force was the best equipped in Latin America. In all, the modern Cuban Air Force imported approximately 230 fixed-wing aircraft. Although there is no exact figure available, Western analysts estimate that at least 130 (with only 25 operational) of these planes are still in service spread out among the thirteen military airbases on the island.

In 1996, fighters from the DAAFAR shot down two Cessna aircraft based in Florida which were accused of dropping leaflets into Cuban airspace. The air force was criticized for not giving the pilots of the aircraft options other than being shot down. One aircraft escaped.

In 1998, according to the same DIA report mentioned above, the air force had 'fewer than 24 operational MIG fighters; pilot training barely adequate to maintain proficiency; a declining number of fighter sorties, surface-to-air missiles and air-defense artillery to respond to attacking air forces.

Organization 
By 2007 the International Institute for Strategic Studies assessed the force as 8,000 strong with 41 combat capable aircraft and a further 189 stored. DAAFAR is divided into three territorial commands known as air zones, in each of which there is a Brigade with several independent Regiments and Squadrons. Each regiment has about 30 aircraft, and squadrons can vary in number, but are usually 12-14 aircraft. DAAFAR is known now to have integrated another Mig-29 and a few MiG-23s which makes it 58 combat aircraft in active service which are listed as 6 MiG-29s, 40 MiG-23s, and 12 MiG-21s. There were also assessed to be 12 operational transport aircraft plus trainers which include 8 L-39C and helicopters which are mainly Mil Mi-8, Mil Mi-17 and Mil Mi-24 Hind. Raúl Castro ordered in 2010 that all MiG-29 pilots had to have full training, they now have from 200–250 hours of flight annually together with real dogfight training and exercises.  Up to 20 MiG-23 units also have this kind of training but the other 16 MiG-23 units spend more time in simulators than real flight.  MiG-21 units have limited time in this exercises and spend more time in simulators and maintain their skills flying with the commercial brand of the air force Aerogaviota.

At San Antonio de los Baños military air field, south west of Havana, several aircraft are visible using Google Earth.

Air bases 

 San Julián Air Base
 San Antonio de los Baños Airfield
 La Coloma Airport
 Santa Clara Air Base
 Cienfuegos Air Base
 Holguín Air Base
 Santiago de Cuba Base
Playa Baracoa Airbase

Units 

 Western Air Zone -  2nd Guards Aviation Brigade "Battle of Girón Beach" (San Antonio de los Baños Airfield)
 21st Fighter Regiment, San Antonio (interception and air support)
 211st Fighter Squadron
 212th Fighter Squadron
 22nd Fighter Regiment, Baracoa (interception and air support)
 221st Fighter Squadron
 222nd Fighter Squadron
 223rd Fighter Squadron
 23rd Fighter Regiment, San Antonio and San Julián (interception and air support)
 231st San Antonio de los Baños Fighter Squadron
 232nd San Julián Fighter Squadron
 24th Tactical Support Regiment, Guines 
 241st Fighter Squadron
 26th Helicopter Regiment, Ciudad Libertad
 261st General Purpose Helicopter Squadron
 262nd General Purpose Helicopter Squadron
 25th Transport Regiment, San Antonio and José Martí
 251st Transport Squadron, Jose Martí Airport
 252nd Transportation Squadron, San Antonio de los Baños
 "Comandante Che Guevara" Air Force Academy, San Julián
 Central Air Zone - 1st Guards Brigade "Battle of Santa Clara"
 11th Fighter Regiment, Santa Clara (interception and air support)
 111th Fighter Squadron
 112th Fighter Squadron
 12th Fighter Regiment, Sancti Spiritus (interception and air support)
 121st Fighter Squadron
 122nd Fighter Squadron
 14th Tactical Support Regiment, Santa Clara (fighter-bombers)
 141th Fighter Squadron
 16th Helicopter Regiment, Cienfuegos
 162nd Helicopter Squadron
 163rd Helicopter Squadron
 Naval Aviation of the Revolutionary Navy, Cienfuegos
 161st Anti-Submarine Warfare Helicopter Squadron
 15th Transportation Regiment, Cienfuegos
 151st Transport Squadron
 Eastern Air Zone - 3rd Guards Aviation Brigade "Moncada Barracks" 
 31st Fighter Regiment, Camagüey (interception and air support)
 311st Fighter Squadron
 312th Fighter Squadron
 34th Tactical Support Regiment, Holguín (fighter-bombers)
 341st Fighter Squadron
 36th Helicopter Regiment, Santiago de Cuba
 361st Combat Helicopter Squadron
 362nd Helicopter Squadron
 363rd Helicopter Squadron
 35th Transport Regiment, Santiago de Cuba
 351st Transport Squadron

Source:

2nd Guards Aviation Brigade "Girón Beach" 
The 2nd Guards "Playa Girón" Aviation Brigade, based in San Antonio de los Baños, is an elite unit of the DAAFAR. The San Antonio de los Baños air base was built at the end of World War II. In 1976, the unit stationed that received the current name of the Playa Girón Guards Aviation Brigade. In April 1961, was responsible for the defense of Cuba during the Bay of Pigs Invasion. Among its notable members was Cuban cosmonaut Arnaldo Tamayo Méndez. It is a recipient of the Antonio Maceo Order, which was awarded to it in 2014 on its 55th anniversary. In October 2019, the regiment called for the immediate release of former Brazilian President and leader of the Workers Party, Luis Inacio Lula da Silva.

Aircraft

Current inventory

Notes

References

Bibliography
 

 

Cuba
Military of Cuba
Military history of Cuba
Aviation in Cuba